Kevin's is a hurling club based in Dolphin's Barn in Dublin's south inner city, Ireland.

History
Kevin's began promoting hurling and Gaelic football in Dublin's south inner city in 1902. It evolved from the Craobh Chaoimhín of Conradh na Gaeilge. The founder members included Joe O'Neill and Jim Maguire. Information on the formative years is sparse, but Harry O'Kelly, a staunch club member, was believed to be of central importance to the club at this time.

The club attained senior status in 1910, in the mid-1920s and again in the late 1930s and enjoyed sporadic success at senior, intermediate, junior and juvenile levels. In the mid forties, Synge Street P.P. G.F.C. was formed and it assumed responsibility for football in the area. Kevin's became solely a hurling club.

In 1993 history was made. The foundation of Kevin's Camogie section was the result of a new policy being pushed by both the younger members and parent, who wanted to create both a family and community atmosphere within the area.

Kevin's could be regarded as the oldest club in Dublin (with an unbroken affiliation to the Dublin GAA). However, the factual accuracy of this claim was never verified.

Today
Today, Kevin's Hurling and Camogie club continues to promote hurling in Dublin's south inner city and is proactive in attracting young people in the area to the games of hurling and camogie. The club's home ground is in Dolphin Park on the Crumlin Road.

The club runs an Easter Hurling Festival which is an All-Ireland Event organised to pay tribute to and remember past members for their dedication and loyalty to the club. The event was first run in April 2007 and it is officially recognised by the Dublin County Board and the GAA. Emeralds of Urlngford won the inaugural Brian Scott Cup (Senior Competition), beating Camross of Laois in the final. The last tournament was won by Meelick Eyrecourt of Galway in 2010.

Notable players
Joe O'Neill was the first club captain 1902. A successful builder, his portfolio included Synge Street CBS Primary School, a stronghold for Kevin's hurlers to this very day.

John Dunne was the first Kevin's man to represent the club at senior inter-county level in 1914.

Joe Connolly (Leader in City Hall) and Seamus Doyle (Battle of Mount Street Bridge) were two of many Kevin's men who took part in the 1916 uprising.

Sylvestor "Vesty" Muldowney, Charlie McMahon, Brendan Kinna and John Lawless played for successful Dublin teams in the late 1920s and early 1930s. Kevin's supplied a number of players to the first county team to win a National League title. Vesty played a prominent role in 1932 when Dublin reached the National League final and Charlie won an All-Ireland medal with the Dubs in 1939.

Finbar Fagan represented Dublin at Minor level in 1938, and played against Christy Ring in the All-Ireland final of that year. Other notable players from that era included Jimmy Bradley and Peader Carton (grandfather of Peader and Michael from the O'Tooles club).

Freddie Strahan was a key member of the club team that won the 1956 Dublin Minor Hurling Championship. The following year he signed for the Shelbourne Soccer Club and represented Ireland at senior international level. Renowned tenor John McNally was also on that 1956 panel, but was more noted for his singing ability.

Gerry Ryan hurled with the Dubs at various levels before representing the club at senior inter-county level for a number of years in the early 1970s.

Mick Bollard hurled at minor and under-21 level with the Dubs before establishing himself as a regular keeper on the senior hurling team in the early 1980s. Mick was on the last senior county hurling panel to reach the National League semi-finals. Other prominent club hurlers who played senior inter-county level included John Treacey, Donal Tutty, Joey Dalton, Andy Doyle, Greg Balfe and Tommy Daly.

Sean O'Shea is the only Kevin's man to hurl senior with the Dubs in its second century.

Roll of honour

Hurling
 Dublin Senior Hurling Championship:s (0):- Finalists 1926
  Dublin Senior B Hurling Championship Finalists 1999
 Dublin Senior Hurling League Division Two Winners (5): 1913, 1985, 1987, 1989, 1996
 Dublin Intermediate Hurling Championship:s (4): 1924, 1979, 2002, 2010 
 Leinster Junior Club Hurling Championship: Finalists 2002
 Dublin Intermediate Hurling Leagues (2): 1979 – runners up in 1978
 Corn Céitinn (2): 1938, 1978
 Dublin Junior Hurling Championships (3): 1910, 1939, 1978 – finalists in 1977
 Dublin Junior Hurling League (3): 1908, 1937, 1954
 Corn Fogarty (1): 1988
 Miller Shield (1): 2003
 Fletcher Shield (1): 2001
 Dublin Under 21 Hurling Championship:s (0):- Finalists in 1979
 Dublin Minor Hurling Championship:s (4): 1919, 1922, 1923, 1956 – finalists in 1978
 Dublin Under 16 Hurling Championships (1): 1976
 Dublin Juvenile Hurling Championships (1): 1973
 Dublin Under 15 Hurling League (1): 1973
 Féile na nGael (3): 1982 Div 3, 1985 Div 5, 2005 Div 2,

Camogie
 Dublin Junior B Camogie Shield (1): 2008
 Dublin Junior B 2 Camogie League (1): 2008
 Dublin Junior B Camogie Open Cup (1): 2008
 Mascot Cup Winners (1): 1997
 Dublin Under 16 Camogie League (1): 1998

Gaelic football
 Dublin Minor Football Championships (4) 1932, 1937, 1938, 1940. Kevins also won in 1922, but this is not recorded as a championship

References

Gaelic games clubs in Dublin (city)
Hurling clubs in Dublin (city)